P. aurea  may refer to:
 Pachycephala aurea, the golden-backed whistler, a bird species found in Indonesia and Papua New Guinea
 Paradrymonia aurea, a plant species endemic to Ecuador
 Pentachaeta aurea, the golden-rayed pentachaeta or golden chaetopappa, a flowering plant species endemic to southern California
 Phaeolepiota aurea, the golden bootleg or golden cap, a mushroom species found throughout North America and Eurasia
 Phyllostachys aurea, a bamboo species
 Pimpinella aurea, a plant species in the genus Pimpinella
 Pipiza aurea, a hoverfly species in the genus Pipiza
 Pitcairnia aurea, a plant species endemic to Bolivia
 Pleomele aurea, the golden Hala Pepe, a flowering plant species endemic to the island of Kauaʻi in Hawaii
 Protea aurea, the long-bud sugarbush, a shrub or small tree species occurring in mountain fynbos in Sourh Africa

See also
 Aurea (disambiguation)